The Standard, East Village, formerly the Cooper Square Hotel, is a 21-story high-rise luxury hotel located at 25 Cooper Square in lower Manhattan, New York City. The tower was designed by Carlos Zapata Studio and structurally engineered by Leslie E. Robertson Associates. It has interiors by the Milanese designer Antonio Citterio. The hotel, which opened in December 2008, has 145 rooms and is the location of the Narcissa restaurant owned by André Balazs and Chef John Fraser.

The Cooper Square Hotel became a Standard Hotel in 2011, and as of 2013 is undergoing renovations.

References 
Notes

External links

 Official website

Skyscraper hotels in Manhattan